Karel Matoušek (10 May 1928 – 1 January 2018) a Czech wrestler. He competed in the men's Greco-Roman lightweight at the 1960 Summer Olympics.

References

External links
 

1928 births
2018 deaths
Czech male sport wrestlers
Olympic wrestlers of Czechoslovakia
Wrestlers at the 1960 Summer Olympics
Sportspeople from Prague